Kelvin Kenneth Ogilvie  (born November 6, 1942) is a Canadian academic and politician. A former president of Acadia University in Wolfville, he was named to the Senate of Canada as a Conservative on August 27, 2009, and served until his retirement on November 6, 2017. He was an international expert in biotechnology, bioorganic chemistry and genetic engineering.

Scientific career
Ogilvie is a leading expert on biotechnology, bioorganic chemistry and genetic engineering. His scientific accomplishments include the development of the chemistry of the Bio Logicals’ “Gene Machine”, an automated process for the manufacture of DNA. He is the inventor of Ganciclovir, a drug used worldwide to fight infections (Cytomegalovirus or CMV) that occur when one’s immune system is weakened.  He also developed a general method for the chemical synthesis of large RNA molecules, demonstrated by the first total chemical synthesis of a functional Transfer RNA (tRNA) molecule, which is still the basis for RNA synthesis worldwide.

Ogilvie was a chemistry professor at the University of Manitoba from 1968 to 1974, at McGill University from 1974 to 1987, and at Acadia University from 1987 to 1993 while also serving as vice-president (academic).  He has received numerous awards during his long and prestigious career including being named a Steacie Fellow in 1982, admission to the Order of Canada in 1991, the Manning Principal Award as Canada’s outstanding contributor to innovation in 1992, induction into the Canadian Science and Engineering Hall of Fame in 2011 and the Rx&D Health Research Foundation Medal of Honour in 2013.

Administrative and political career

Ogilvie served for three years as chair of Nova Scotia Premier’s Council for Innovation and is Senior Fellow for Postsecondary Education at the Atlantic Institute for Market Studies, a rightwing thinktank. He served on the board of Genome Canada and chaired the advisory board of National Research Council’s Institute of Marine Bioscience and the Advisory Board of the Atlantic Innovation Fund.

Ogilvie was named to the Order of Canada in 1991.

He was president and vice-chancellor of Acadia University from 1993 to 2003.

From 1993 to 2003 he served as president and vice-chancellor of Acadia University in Wolfville, Nova Scotia, where he led the development and implementation of the acclaimed Acadia Advantage Program, which was recognized by and incorporated into the Permanent Collection of the Smithsonian Institution in Washington, D.C., in 1999.

He was appointed to the Canadian Senate by Prime Minister Stephen Harper on August 27, 2009, and he retired in November 2017. While in the Senate he chaired the Standing Senate Committee on Social Affairs, Science and Technology that produced a number of important studies on health issues affecting Canadians.  The last report was “The Role of Robotics, 3D Printing and Artificial Intelligence in the Healthcare System” (November 2017).

References

External links
 

1942 births
Living people
Members of the Order of Canada
Canadian senators from Nova Scotia
Conservative Party of Canada senators
Canadian university and college chief executives
Academic staff of McGill University
21st-century Canadian politicians